The Wooden Horse is a 1950 British Second World War war film directed by Jack Lee and starring Leo Genn,  David Tomlinson and Anthony Steel. It is based on the book of the same name by Eric Williams, who also wrote the screenplay.

The film depicts the true events of an escape attempt made by POWs in the German prison camp Stalag Luft III. The wooden horse in the title of the film is a piece of exercise equipment the prisoners use to conceal their escape attempt as well as a reference to the Trojan Horse which was also used to conceal men within.

The Wooden Horse was shot in a low-key style, with a limited budget and a cast including many amateur actors.

Plot

The somewhat fictionalised version of the true story is set in Stalag Luft III — the same POW camp where the real events depicted in the film The Great Escape took place, albeit from a different compound – and involved Williams, Michael Codner and Oliver Philpot, all inmates of the camp. In the book and film, the escapees are renamed "Flight Lieutenant Peter Howard", "Captain John Clinton" and "Philip Rowe".

The prisoners are faced with the problem of digging an escape tunnel despite the accommodation huts, within which the tunnel entrance might be concealed, being a considerable distance from the perimeter fence. They come up with an ingenious way of digging the tunnel with its entrance located in the middle of an open area relatively near the perimeter fence and using a vaulting horse (constructed largely from plywood from Canadian Red Cross parcels), to cover the entrance.

Recruiting fellow-prisoners to form a team of vaulters, each day they carry the horse out to the same spot, with a man hidden inside. The prisoners begin gymnastic exercises using the vaulting horse, while the concealed man digs down below it. At the end of the session, the digger places wooden boards, cut to fit the aperture, in the hole, and fills the space with sandbags and dry sand kept for the purpose – wet sand taken from below the surface would be darker and hence give away the tunneling activity.

As the tunnel lengthens, two men are eventually hidden inside the horse while a larger group of men exercise, the two men continue to dig the tunnel. At the end of the day, they conceal the tunnel entrance once more and hide inside the horse while it is carried back to their hut. They also devise a method of disposing of the earth coming out of the tunnel. They recruit a third man, Phil, to assist them, with the promise that he will join the escape.

At the final break-out, Clinton hides in the tunnel during an Appell (roll call), before three men are carried out in the horse: the third to replace the tunnel trap.

Howard and Clinton travel by train to the Baltic port of Lübeck; (in fact, they travelled via Frankfurt an der Oder to Stettin). Phil elects to travel alone, posing as a Norwegian margarine salesman and travelling by train via Danzig (now Gdańsk). He was the first to get to neutral territory.

On the docks Howard and Clinton are forced to kill a German sentry who surprised the hiding men; and they contact French workers, through whom they meet "Sigmund", a Danish resistance worker who smuggles them onto a Danish ship. They then have to transfer to a fishing boat and arrive in Copenhagen, before being shipped to neutral Sweden. There they are reunited with Phil, who arrived earlier.

Some details from Williams' book were not used in the film, e.g. the escaped POWs discussing the possibility of visiting potentially neutral brothels in Germany, an idea that was abandoned because of the fear that it might be a trap.

Cast

 Leo Genn as Peter Howard
 David Tomlinson as Philip Rowe
 Anthony Steel as John Clinton
 David Greene as Bennett
 Peter Burton as Nigel
 Patrick Waddington as the Senior British Officer
 Michael Goodliffe as Robbie
 Anthony Dawson as Pomfret
 Bryan Forbes as Paul
 Dan Cunningham as David
 Peter Finch as the Australian in hospital
 Philip Dale as Bill White
 Russell Waters as 'Wings' Cameron
 Ralph Ward as the Adjutant
 Lis Løwert as Kamma

Production
The film was based on a book by Eric Williams which was published in 1949. The book was re-issued in 1980.

Ian Dalrymple and Jack Lee read the book and bought the film rights. They out-bid John Mills who also wanted to make it. "I expect John would have been very good in it also," said Jack Lee "probably better than Leo Genn, who was very stolid as an actor."

Leo Genn played the Eric Williams character while Anthony Steele played a character based on Michael Codner. Codner was later killed in 1952 in an ambush during the Malayan Emergency.

"We are not inventing anything," Lee said during filming. "It isn't necessary. The whole book is dynamite as a film script."

Shooting
Three-quarters of the film was shot in Germany. The Stalag was rebuilt in the British zone near where the Germans surrendered at Lüneburg Heath.

In the film the escapees go to Lübeck, not Stettin, which is what happened in real life. This was because the producers did not want to have to deal with the Russian Occupied Zone.

The film went over budget, for several reasons: the weather was poor and several scenes had to be done again. "A lot of it was my fault, taking too long to shoot and shooting too much stuff," said Lee. He added "there was indecision on my producer's part about the ending; Ian said we should shoot things in two different ways. The ultimate ending was a perfectly reasonable one but I was off the film by then. Ian shot it himself."

Filming was finished in Germany by January 1950 after which studio work was done in London.

The film was a breakthrough role for Anthony Steel. "Tony Steel was fine to work with – just a physical type, a young chap who could do certain things," said Lee. According to Filmink "he is clearly meant to be “the cute one” of the trio, spending a considerable amount of the film’s running time walking around in shorts bare-chested."

Comedian Peter Butterworth had actually been one of the POWs at the camp, and auditioned for a part in the film, but the producers said he didn't look convincing enough.

Reception

Critical
Variety said "a commendable degree, of documentary fidelity has been established in this picturization. of the escape of three prisoners of war from a German camp* The long and torturous period of preparation is faithfully recaptured. Inevitably, treatment rules out a fast-moving production, and although this won’t harm it as a boxoffice attraction at home, it may have a limiting appeal when it eventually reaches the US."

Box Office
The film was the third most popular film at the British box office in 1950. According to Kinematograph Weekly the 'biggest winners' at the box office in 1950 Britain were The Blue Lamp, The Happiest Days of Your Life, Annie Get Your Gun, The Wooden Horse, Treasure Island and Odette, with "runners up" being Stage Fright, White Heat, They Were Not Divided, Trio, Morning Departure, Destination Moon, Sands of Iwo Jima, Little Women, The Forsythe Saga, Father of the Bride, Neptune's Daughter, The Dancing Years, The Red Light, Rogues of Sherwood Forest, Fancy Pants, Copper Canyon, State Secret, The Cure for Love, My Foolish Heart, Stromboli, Cheaper by the Dozen, Pinky, Three Came Home, Broken Arrow and Black Rose.

It led to a series of stories about POWs, including Albert R.N. (1953), The Colditz Story (1955), The One That Got Away (1957), The Camp on Blood Island (1958) and Danger Within (1959).

Reality
The Wooden Horse plan itself was previously thought to be conceived and entirely thought through by Williams and Michael Codner in equal measures. In Oliver Philpot's later book The Stolen Journey, the author made it clear that he initially thought the plan was "crackers", telling its inventors "I give it a couple of days!" Nevertheless, Philpot helped with the sand dispersal and later with the actual digging – at which point he was invited to take part in the escape.
However, it has been argued that Flt Lt Dominic Bruce (the 'Medium Sized man') and Squadron Leader Peter Tunstall are the original innovators of the wooden horse escape technique. Along with Eustace Newborn and Peter Tunstall, Bruce came up with the escape plan now known as "the Swiss Red Cross Commission." Tunstall, wrote that in 1941, prior to he and Bruce planning an escape with the famed 'Swiss Red Cross Commission,' he and Bruce had been digging an escape route with a wooden horse tunnel from inside the gymnasium, the wooden horse was placed roughly four feet from the wall that separated the gym from the moat. The digging was a very slow process, it required the removal of spoil, bricks and stone work,and was aided by other prisoners distracting the guards. They were later joined by Douglas 'Sammy' Hoare and a syndicate who were promised a second go if they escaped undiscovered. Other members of this syndicate were also named as: Harry Bewlay, John Milner and Eustace Newborn.

When Bruce and Tunstall noted the slow process they began examining the rest of the castle and left the digging to the other team involving Sammy Hoare. The tunnel almost reached completion but unfortunately the digging team got caught when a guard become suspicious at the large stones that were accumulating outside of the gym. The guard then called a search, and then found the escape tunnel.[49] When the guards found the shaft they called an Appell and Hauptmann Schmidt confidently stated to the prisoners, "It is impossible to escape by tunnel or any other way."

This wooden horse gym escape tunnel was two years prior to the famed Sagan wooden horse escape. Tunstall stated that he would like to think some of the watchers and workers who helped on their original wooden horse escape may have mentioned it from time to time; and would like to think that their idea contributed to the success of the effort at Sagan.
See https://en.wikipedia.org/wiki/Dominic_Bruce

References

Further reading

External links 
 
 The actual story – WOODEN HORSE ESCAPE KIT PRESENTED TO IMPERIAL WAR MUSEUM
 The Wooden Horse at Screenonline

1950 films
1950s war films
British war films
British black-and-white films
World War II prisoner of war films
World War II films based on actual events
London Films films
Films directed by Jack Lee
Films produced by Ian Dalrymple
1950s English-language films
1950s British films